European route E 847 is a European B class road in Italy, connecting the cities Sicignano degli Alburni – Bernalda.

Route 
 
 E45 Sicignano degli Alburni
 E90 Bernalda

External links 
 UN Economic Commission for Europe: Overall Map of E-road Network (2007)
 International E-road network

International E-road network
Roads in Italy